Sadakpur is a village in Shahkot, a city in the district Jalandhar of Indian state of Punjab.

Transportation 
Sadakpur lies on the Nakodar-Shahkot road. The nearest railway station to Sadakpur is Shahkot railway station at a distance of 6 km.

Post office 
Sadakpur's post office is Dhandewal.

References 

Villages in Jalandhar district